Gobiatoides is an extinct genus of prehistoric frogs from Uzbekistan.

See also
 Prehistoric amphibian
 List of prehistoric amphibians

References

Late Cretaceous amphibians
Cretaceous frogs